This is a list of football clubs in Belgium by year of origin.

List

 

    
Belgium
clubs
Football clubs

ru:Список футбольных клубов Бельгии